This is a list of merit badges formerly offered by the Boy Scouts of America. In some cases, the entire subject has been dropped from the merit badge roster. In others, the merit badge's name has been changed, with or without significant revision to the badge's requirements.

In 2010, in celebration of Scouting's 100th anniversary, four historical merit badges were reintroduced for one year only—Carpentry, Pathfinding, Signaling and Tracking (formerly Stalking). Bugling merit badge was briefly discontinued in 2010 but reinstated after complaints from volunteers.

Original 57 merit badges

See also

 History of merit badges (Boy Scouts of America)
 Merit badge (Boy Scouts of America)

References

Advancement and recognition in the Boy Scouts of America
Scouting-related lists